Tadeusz Władysław Sawicz (13 February 1914 – 19 October 2011) was a Polish World War II fighter pilot. He served in the Polish Air Force, and after the fall of Poland, he served in the Polish and allied units in France and United Kingdom. He was the commander of several air units, including the No. 315 Polish Fighter Squadron, 1st Polish Fighter Wing, 3rd Polish Fighter Wing, 131st (Polish) Fighter Wing and 133rd Fighter Wing. He participated in the Battle of Britain and was ranked as the 82nd highest scoring Polish fighter pilot of the war.

In addition to receiving Poland's highest military decoration, the Virtuti Militari, he was awarded a British Distinguished Flying Cross, an American Distinguished Flying Cross and the Dutch equivalent, the Airman's Cross or Vliegerkruis. In 2006 Sawicz was appointed honorary brigadier-general in the Polish Air Force.

After the war he emigrated to Canada. At his death he was believed to have been the last surviving Polish pilot to have fought in the Battle of Britain.

Biography

In Poland and France
Sawicz was born on 13 February 1914 in Warsaw. In 1934 he joined the Polish Army in the Second Polish Republic, as an officer and in 1934 began training in the air force. In August 1936 he received the rank of podporucznik and joined the 111th Fighter Escadrille. In 1937 he was transferred to the 114th Fighter Escadrille.

During the Polish September Campaign in September 1939 he served (from 5 September) as the deputy commander of the 114th Escadrille, which together with several other air units was a part of the Pursuit Brigade. He claimed a half-share in damaging a German Messerschmitt Bf 109 on the first day of the war, while flying a PZL P.11c. Over the next week he was reported to have shot down two Dorniers Do 17 bombers, damaging two more. On 14 September he was assigned a courier mission, delivering messages to General Juliusz Rómmel, and Marshal Edward Rydz-Śmigły, flying into the encircled pocket at Młynów. After the Soviet invasion of Poland on 17 September, the Polish government decided to evacuate the country and ordered the remaining airforce to evacuate as well. Travelling via Romania, Yugoslavia and Italy, Sawicz eventually reached France where he was assigned to the French Air Force (see also Polish Army in France). After training in Lyon, on 1 June 1940 he was assigned to Groupe de Chasse III/10 stationed in Deauville.

In Great Britain
After the fall of France, like many other Polish pilots he did not surrender and took a Bloch MB.152 across the Mediterranean to Algeria, from where he went to Casablanca in Morocco and via Gibraltar to Great Britain, arriving on 17 July. After four months training at No.5 OTU at Aston Down, he joined the newly recreated Polish Air Force in the Great Britain.

In Great Britain he was assigned on 20 October to No. 303 Polish Fighter Squadron during the Battle of Britain. On 22 February 1941 he was transferred to No. 316 Polish Fighter Squadron. On 9 April he shot down a Heinkel He 111 bomber, which was reported as the new squadron's first confirmed kill. In July he was awarded the first Cross of Valour and promoted. From 9 November 1941 he served as commander of the Escadrille A of the No. 316 Squadron.

From June 1942 he served as a flight instructor with No. 58 OTU. On 25 September 1942 he became commander of No. 315 Polish Fighter Squadron. During his time with 315 Squadron he damaged a Focke Wulf 190 on 4 April. On 16 April 1943 he became the deputy commander of the 1st Polish Fighter Wing, and was awarded the Poland's highest military decoration, the Virtuti Militari. From June 1943 he was a liaison officer with No. 12 Group RAF. From 18 October 1943 he served in a training capacity at Rednal. On 3 April 1944 he was attached to the headquarters of the 9th Air Force of the USAAF as liaison officer.

He was then assigned to the 56th Fighter Group, under Polish-American fighter ace Francis Gabreski where he formed a Polish section. For his time with the 56th Group, he was awarded the US Air Medal and Distinguished Flying Cross. On 14 June 1944 he was given the command of the 3rd Polish Fighter Wing, and on 10 October 1944, became commander of the 131st (Polish) Fighter Wing. Soon after taking the command, he was injured in a crash. On 16 July 1945 he returned to duty as the commander of the Polish 3rd Wing. Later he commanded the 133rd Fighter Wing.

During the war he had claimed 3 confirmed victories and 3 and a half "damaged". He is ranked (on Bajan's list) as the 82nd highest scoring Polish fighter pilot of the war.

After the war
He was demobilized in January 1947 with the rank of major. He chose not to return to Poland, where the new communist government was hostile towards those who had served in the Polish Armed Forces in the West. In 1957 he emigrated to Canada, where he worked in the air industry, living in Montreal and Etobicoke.

In 2006 Sawicz was appointed honorary brigadier-general by then-Polish president Lech Kaczyński. At his death on 19 October 2011 he was believed to have been the last surviving Polish pilot to have fought in the Battle of Britain.

Decorations

References

1914 births
2011 deaths
Polish World War II pilots
Recipients of the Silver Cross of the Virtuti Militari
Recipients of the Cross of Valour (Poland)
Recipients of the Distinguished Flying Cross (United Kingdom)
Recipients of the Distinguished Flying Cross (United States)
Recipients of the Air Medal
Recipients of the Airman's Cross
Royal Air Force officers
United States Air Force officers
The Few
Royal Air Force pilots of World War II
Polish emigrants to Canada